Peter Sacristani (born 15 September 1957) is an Australian former cricketer. He played seven first-class cricket matches for Victoria between 1982 and 1983.

See also
 List of Victoria first-class cricketers

References

1957 births
Living people
Australian cricketers
Victoria cricketers
Cricketers from Melbourne